Loch Brecbowie is a Scottish loch located in the Ayrshire region, near the town of Girvan.

The small, freshwater loch contains four small islands. It is situated on the western side of Craigbrock Hill.

References

Lochs of South Ayrshire
Freshwater lochs of Scotland